List of players with 1000 points may refer to:
List of NHL players with 1,000 points
List of players with 1,000 NRL points